Jarrod Saffy (born 24 October 1984) is a rugby union player. He played rugby league for the St George Illawarra Dragons in the NRL before switching to rugby union with the Melbourne Rebels for the 2011 Super Rugby season.

Background
He was born in Johannesburg, South Africa.

Early career
Saffy moved to Australia as a 15-year-old and continued playing rugby union at St Joseph's, Hunters Hill. He represented the Australian Schoolboys, Australian under 21s and the Australian Sevens in rugby union as well as spending some time playing for the NSW Waratahs Academy and Sydney University Football Club.

As he has played sevens for Australia he is tied to them in Rugby Union.

Rugby League
Saffy switched to rugby league to progress faster and made his debut in first grade in rugby league in the final round 26 match of 2006 for the Wests Tigers. He made seven first grade appearances for the Tigers in 2007. Saffy played rugby league at second-row and also at prop-forward.

He played in St George's 2010 NRL Grand Final-winning team, and thus became the second South African-born player to win a premiership.

He was eligible to represent Lebanon as well as his native South Africa and he was also eligible to represent Australia in Rugby League.

Rugby Union 
In April 2010 Saffy became the first NRL player to sign with the Melbourne Rebels Super Rugby franchise. In October he commenced training with the Rebels for the new team's in the 2011 Super Rugby debut. He was expected to play at either blindside flanker or No. 8.

In May 2011 Saffy was named in the Rebels squad to travel to Pretoria and Bloemfontein for the Rebels' "challenging double-header" against the Bulls and Cheetahs.

In 2013 Saffy trained to be the Rebels first choice openside flanker, in competition with newcomers Scott Fuglistaller and Jordy Reid.

Saffy signed with French club US Bressane in November 2013.

References

External links
 Melbourne Rebels Player Profile
 Jarrod Saffy,  Rebels Media Unit news release, 16 February 2011

1984 births
Australian rugby union players
Australian rugby league players
South African rugby league players
South African rugby union players
Australian people of Lebanese descent
Melbourne Rebels players
Wests Tigers players
St. George Illawarra Dragons players
Balmain Ryde-Eastwood Tigers players
Rugby union flankers
Rugby union number eights
Rugby league second-rows
Rugby league props
South African emigrants to Australia
Rugby union players from Johannesburg
People educated at St Joseph's College, Hunters Hill
Living people
Australian expatriate rugby union players
Expatriate rugby union players in France